The Land Before Time II: The Great Valley Adventure is a 1994 American direct-to-video animated adventure musical film directed by Roy Allen Smith. It is the second installment and a sequel to the 1988 film The Land Before Time. It was released six years after the original and was the first in the series to be a direct-to-video production.

Plot 
Littlefoot, Cera, Ducky, Petrie, and Spike live a carefree life in the Great Valley under their families' watchful eyes. One day, the gang attempts to get to the sheltering grass to play, but land in the sinking sand surrounding it. The adults rescue them and chastise them for their recklessness. The next night, the children have a secret meeting and decide to prove their bravery and maturity by venturing into the Mysterious Beyond, a location outside the Valley that is inhabited by Sharpteeth. Before they leave, they notice two eggnappers, Ozzy and Strut, stealing an egg from the nest of Ducky's mother. The children pursue the intruders into the Mysterious Beyond. An ensuing landslide damages the Great Wall that surrounds the Valley and protects it from the Sharpteeth, and the stolen egg rolls safely back to the nest, but the group does not notice this in the confusion.

In the Mysterious Beyond, the group discover another, larger egg and mistake it for the original. The gang transports the egg into the Valley, and despite finding the original egg back in Ducky's nest, they decide to hatch it. The gang doesn't realize it's from another nest. The egg eventually hatches, revealing a baby Sharptooth. Although Littlefoot's friends are frightened off, Littlefoot quickly realizes that the baby Sharptooth is not yet dangerous, and decides to raise the newly christened "Chomper" as his parent. This task proves difficult as Chomper is not an herbivore, and Littlefoot has no experience raising a child. Ozzy and Strut appear to exact revenge on the group for foiling their earlier theft, but are driven away by Chomper's enlarged shadow, which they mistake for that of an adult Sharptooth. The rest of the gang meets Chomper and they accept him as part of the group until he hungrily bites Cera by accident. The group's knee-jerk reaction causes Chomper to run off in tears. The others follow him to a smoking mountain, where Ozzy and Strut attempt once more to attack the children, but are stopped when the mountain's eruption sends them plummeting down a canyon. After the group escapes, they encounter two adult Sharpteeth, who have managed to enter the Valley through the opening in the Great Wall. The whole Great Valley population drives the Sharpteeth off, and the children make it back to their families, but Chomper feels left out and runs away again.

The adults inquire as to how the Sharpteeth entered the Valley, prompting the children to explain the events that resulted in the landslide. The adults set off to put together a plan to close the opening for good, telling the children to stay behind. Littlefoot runs to the forest to find Chomper. After finding him, they are chased and cornered by the two Sharpteeth. Chomper roars at them, and they recognize him as their son and leave with him. Littlefoot is then kidnapped by Ozzy and Strut, who plan to throw him off the Great Wall. Chomper hears Littlefoot screaming and leads his parents to Littlefoot's location. Chomper's parents rescue Chomper from an attempted intervention, and inadvertently do the same thing for Littlefoot by chasing Ozzy and Strut back into the Mysterious Beyond. Littlefoot bids Chomper farewell as he follows his parents, and he returns to the Valley to assist the adults in sealing up the entrance between the Valley and the Mysterious Beyond. Following his experiences, Littlefoot tells his grandparents that being young is not so bad after all, but decides he still looks forward to growing up.

Voice cast 

 Scott McAfee as Littlefoot
 Candace Hutson as Cera
 Heather Hogan as Ducky
 Jeff Bennett as Petrie / Ozzy
 Rob Paulsen as Spike / Strut / Chomper
 Kenneth Mars as  Grandpa Longneck
 Linda Gary as Grandma Longneck
 Tress MacNeille as Petrie's Mother / Ducky's Mother / Maiasaura
 John Ingle as Narrator / Cera's father

Production 
In July 1993, Universal Cartoon Studios announced that a direct-to-video sequel to The Land Before Time was in development. A release date was not set at that time.

Music 
This was the film that introduced the musical format to the series and every subsequent film has followed this style ever since. Even though the film features an original score by Michael Tavera, it contains musical cues from James Horner's score of the original film. Tavera has been the main music composer for the sequels ever since.

Release 
The film was released in the United States on December 13, 1994.

Reception 
In 2011, Total Film ranked it as 7th among the "50 Worst Kids Movies". In August 2014, the New York Post ranked each of the 13 Land Before Time films released up to that point and placed The Great Valley Adventure at number 5. The New York Post wrote that out of each film, The Great Valley Adventure "does the best job of maintaining some of the darker tone of the original movie while broadening its humor for younger audiences. But it's also responsible for introducing the musical format, so, boo." The film received a nomination for "Best Animated Video Production" at the 23rd Annie Awards in 1995, losing to The Gate to the Mind's Eye.

References

External links 

 

The Land Before Time films
Direct-to-video sequel films
1994 animated films
1994 films
1994 direct-to-video films
American children's animated adventure films
1990s English-language films
Universal Pictures direct-to-video animated films
Universal Animation Studios animated films
Films scored by Michael Tavera
1990s American animated films
Films about volcanoes
Animated films about dinosaurs
1990s children's animated films
Films directed by Roy Allen Smith